The 1999 NAIA Men's Division I Basketball Tournament was held in March at Donald W. Reynolds Center in Tulsa, Oklahoma, and the only time for now NAIA Tournament. The 62nd annual NAIA basketball tournament featured 32 teams playing in a single-elimination format.

Awards and honors
Leading scorers: 
Leading rebounder: 
Player of the Year: Jay Mauck (Oklahoma Christian).

1999 NAIA bracket

  * denotes overtime.

See also
 1999 NCAA Division I men's basketball tournament
 1999 NCAA Division II men's basketball tournament
 1999 NCAA Division III men's basketball tournament
 1999 NAIA Division II men's basketball tournament
 1999 NAIA Division I women's basketball tournament

References

Tournament
NAIA Men's Basketball Championship
NAIA Division I men's basketball tournament
NAIA Division I men's basketball tournament